Giovanni Delago (31 January 1903 – 14 August 1987) was an Italian cross-country skier. He competed in the men's 50 kilometre event at the 1932 Winter Olympics.

References

External links
 

1903 births
1987 deaths
Italian male cross-country skiers
Olympic cross-country skiers of Italy
Cross-country skiers at the 1932 Winter Olympics
People from Sëlva
Sportspeople from Südtirol